The four-chained slider (Lerista quadrivincula) is a species of skink found in Western Australia.

References

Lerista
Reptiles described in 1991
Taxa named by Glenn Michael Shea